El-Desoky Ismail Abdulraouf Muhammad Shaban (also El-Desoki Ismail, ; born January 1, 1983, in Kafr el-Sheikh) is an amateur Egyptian freestyle wrestler, who played for the men's super heavyweight category. Ismail represented Egypt at the 2012 Summer Olympics in London, where he competed for the men's 120 kg class. He received a bye for the preliminary round of sixteen match, before losing out to U.S. wrestler Tervel Dlagnev, with a two-set technical score (2–6, 0–1), and a classification point score of 1–3.

References

External links
Profile – International Wrestling Database
NBC Olympics Profile

1983 births
Living people
Egyptian male sport wrestlers
Olympic wrestlers of Egypt
Wrestlers at the 2012 Summer Olympics